Mia Bak Pedersen (born 8 October 1980) is a Danish football defender who has played for the Danish national team.  In the 2007 and 2008 seasons she played in Norway for Asker SK.  A serious injury in the off-season took her out of football for a prolonged period and in 2009 she moved back to Denmark to join the Danish club IK Skovbakken in Aarhus, playing in the elite 3F league and starting well with a goal on August 5 against Vejle.

References
Profile at club site
Danish Football Union (DBU) statistics

1980 births
Living people
Danish women's footballers
Denmark women's international footballers
Women's association football defenders